Hounsfield may refer to:

Places

Canada
Hounsfield Heights/Briar Hill, Calgary, an inner suburban neighbourhood in northwest Calgary, Alberta, Canada

United States
Hounsfield, New York, a town in Jefferson County, New York, United States

People with the surname 

Godfrey Hounsfield (1919–2004), English electrical engineer who shared the 1979 Nobel Prize for Physiology or Medicine
Harold William Hounsfield Riley (1877–1946), Canadian politician
Reginald Hounsfield (1882–1939), English footballer
Thomas Hounsfield (1910–1994), English cricketer

See also
 Hounsfield scale, a quantitative measure of radiodensity used in evaluating CT scans